Edsall Elliott Walker (September 15, 1910 – February 19, 1997) was an American pitcher in Negro league baseball. He played for the Homestead Grays and Philadelphia Stars between 1936 and 1945.

References

External links
 and Seamheads

1910 births
1997 deaths
Homestead Grays players
Philadelphia Stars players
People from Catskill, New York
Baseball players from New York (state)
20th-century African-American sportspeople